Bankara is a village in the Ouham region in the Central African Republic.

Nearby towns and villages include Benesa (1.0 nm), Botokoni (2.2 nm) and Bouasi (2.2 nm) 
.

References

External links
Satellite map at maplandia.com

Populated places in Ouham